The Dubliners 50th Anniversary Tour was a tour in 2012 by The Dubliners celebrating 50 years. The group was awarded a lifetime achievement award by BBC Radio 2 in February. However, in April, founding member and tenor banjo player Barney McKenna died. Banjo player Gerry O'Connor filled his place until the end of the tour. In November the group released the album 50 Years charting in the Irish Top 10. John Sheahan after 48 years decided he could no longer continue with the band due to the death of Barney McKenna. In December the group played its final concerts at Vicar Street and were joined on stage by Jim McCann. The band met with President Michael Higgins in the presidential palace in Dublin. The group appeared on BBC's Jools Holland Annual Hootenanny on New Year's Eve. With the exception of John Sheahan, the rest of the group continues touring as The Dublin Legends - Spirit of the Dubliners.

Setlist

 The Fermoy Lassies / Sporting Paddy	
 Seven Drunken Nights (Archive Video featuring Ronnie Drew)
 The Rare Auld Mountain Dew
 The Ferryman
 Fiddler's Green (Archive Video featuring Barney McKenna)
 The Belfast Hornpipe / The Swallow's Tail
 Poem for Luke (Poem, recited by John Sheahan)	
 Kelly the Boy from Killan  (Archive Video featuring Luke Kelly)
 Dirty Old Town
 The Rare Auld Times
 When the Boys Come Rolling Home
 Fáinne Geal an Lae
 Poem for Barney (Poem, recited by John Sheahan)
 Banjo Solo
 Billy In The Lowground / The Moving Cloud   
 The Monto (Archive Video featuring Luke Kelly)
 All for Me Grog
 Remembering Ciarán (Poem, recited by John Sheahan)
 Bainne na mBó (Archive Video featuring Ciarán Bourke)
 Peggy Lettermore
 Farewell to Harstad
 Feathered Gael / Jackie Coleman's Reel
 I Wish I Had Someone to Love Me (Archive Video featuring Barney McKenna)
 The Rocky Road to Dublin
 A Pint of Plain (Archive Video featuring Ronnie Drew)
 Finnegan's Wake
 Sketch of a Dubliner (Poem, recited by John Sheahan)
 McAlpine's Fusiliers (Archive Video featuring Ronnie Drew)
 Cooley's Reel / The Dawn / The Mullingar Races
 The Black Velvet Band / Dicey Reilly / The Marino Waltz / The Irish Rover
 Whiskey in the Jar
Encore:
 The Wild Rover
 Molly Malone

Tour dates

Line up

The Dubliners
Seán Cannon - Lead Vocals, Guitar
Patsy Watchorn - Lead Vocals, Banjo
John Sheahan - Fiddle, Mandolin, Tin Whistle
Eamonn Campbell - Guitar
Barney McKenna - Tenor Banjo, Mandolin, Vocals (January–April, died 5 April)

Guest Musicians
Gerry O'Connor - Tenor Banjo, fiddle (April–December) 
Christy Sheridan - Tenor Banjo (May)
Chris Kavanagh - Vocals, banjo (February)
Jim McCann - Guitar (December)

Featured in Archive Videos
Luke Kelly: "Kelly, the Boy from Killan", "The Monto"
Ronnie Drew: "Seven Drunken Nights", "McAlpines Fusiliers", "A Pint of Plain"
Ciarán Bourke: "Bainne na mBó"
Barney McKenna (April–December): "Fiddler's Green", "I Wish I Had Someone to Love Me"

References

The Dubliners concert tours
2012 concert tours